The Socialist Party of Navarre is a regional branch of the mainstream Spanish Socialist Workers' Party (PSOE), the main centre-left party in Spain since the 1970s.

History
The party can trace its history to the founding of a socialist support group for like-minded men in Pamplona in August 1902. The Socialist Group of Navarre was subsumed in the PSOE's Basque branch up to 1980, but then it veered towards a Navarre-only stance, refusing to support a referendum on the inclusion of Navarre in a Basque community (December 1979) and aligning itself in this particular point with rightist forces (UCD, UPN).

In August 2007, Socialist chief officials in Madrid instructed the head of the party in Navarre Carlos Chivite and his PSN peers to undo the agreement reached with Nafarroa Bai to produce a progressive majority, and allow UPN to govern Navarre instead. The former Secretary-General was Roberto Jiménez, who won 70.5% of the vote in an election at the ninth regional congress on June 28, 2008. He took over from Carlos Chivite after the latter's death earlier that same year. In the 2008 elections for the Parliament of Navarre the party received 115,837 votes, placing second behind the governing UPN. Since December 2014, Maria Chivite, niece of Carlos Chivite, is the Secretary-General of the PSN.

In February 2014, during the latest crisis affecting the credit of UPN high-ranking officials in government, PSN refused to impeach regional president Yolanda Barcina despite the clarity of the allegations and wide consensus among Navarrese political forces on the severity of the institutional crisis. Instead, the PSN leader Roberto Jimenez focused on "thoroughly condemning" and extensively elaborating on verbal abuse hurled by a crowd of protesters voicing their anger at Y. Barcina and other UPN officials in Tafalla. In 2011 members disaffected with PSN's alliance policy contributed to the foundation of the coalition Izquierda-Ezkerra—2 MPs in the Parliament of Navarre (July 2015).

Electoral performance

Parliament of Navarre

Cortes Generales

European Parliament

Secretary-General
 Gabriel Urralburu (15 June 1982 – 20 June 1994)
 Javier Otano (20 June 1994 – 20 June 1996)
 Juan José Lizarbe (18 December 1997 – 18 July 2004)
 Carlos Chivite (18 July 2004 – 31 March 2008)
 Roberto Jiménez (28 June 2008 – 13 December 2014)
 María Chivite (13 December 2014 – present)

References

External links
 official site

Navarre
Political parties in Navarre
Political parties with year of establishment missing
Social democratic parties in Spain